Trigynaea triplinervis is a species of plant in the family Annonaceae. It is endemic to Ecuador.  Its natural habitat is subtropical or tropical moist lowland forests. It is threatened by habitat loss.

References

Annonaceae
Endemic flora of Ecuador
Near threatened flora of South America
Taxonomy articles created by Polbot